Murphy Lake is a lake at Moultrie in Colquitt County, Georgia, United States.

It is a location for bass, channel catfish and bream fishing.

References

Murphy
Bodies of water of Colquitt County, Georgia